Colonel Harry Leslie Blundell McCalmont, CB (30 May 1861 – 8 December 1902) was a British army officer, race-horse owner, yachtsman and Conservative party politician.

Life

He was the son of Hugh Barklie Blundell McCalmont, and was educated at Eton College before gaining a commission in the 6th Regiment of Foot in 1881. He subsequently transferred to the Scots Guards four years later.

In 1888, his millionaire great uncle, Hugh McCalmont died. 
Under the conditions of his will, a trust fund was established paying Harry McCalmont 2,000 Pounds sterling a year for seven years, after which he would inherit the remainder of the estate. He used this income to purchase the Cheveley Park estate and stud farm near Newmarket from the Duke of Rutland. There he established a successful stable of racehorses. Among his horses were Timothy, a winner of the Ascot Gold Cup and Alexandra Plate and Isinglass winner of The Derby, St. Leger Stakes and Epsom Gold Cup. He retired from the regular army in 1889, becoming colonel of the 6th (Militia) Battalion of the Royal Warwickshire Regiment. He was also a keen yachtsman and member of the Royal Yacht Squadron.

In 1895 a general election was called, and McCalmont was selected as Conservative candidate for the Newmarket constituency, then held by the Liberals. He was successful, unseating the sitting Member of Parliament, Sir George Newnes.

The Second Boer War broke out in 1899, and in the following year McCalmont's battalion went to South Africa, serving in the Cape Colony and Orange River Colony. He was made a Companion of the Order of the Bath (CB) for his services in the war. A general election was held in 1900, and McCalmont, who was still in South Africa, was re-elected with an increased majority. His opponent in the election was C. D. Rose, owner of the racehorse Ravensbury which had been a rival to Isinglass.

Through both his racing interests and the connections of his second wife, McCalmont advanced in society. King Edward VII visited McCalmont for shooting at Cheveley park in November 1902, as part of a trip to Newmarket.

He died suddenly at his London home from heart failure in December 1902.

Family

He was married to Amy Miller, daughter of Major John Miller, who died in 1889; and then in 1897 to Winifred de Bathe, daughter of Sir Henry de Bathe, 4th Baronet.  A sister-in-law was Lillie Langtry, who married the son of Sir Henry, Hugo Gerald de Bathe, in 1899.
He left no issue, and the bulk of his fortune passed to his second cousin, Dermot McCalmont, son of his father's first cousin, Colonel Sir Hugh McCalmont, KCB.

Arms

References

Attribution

External links

Conservative Party (UK) MPs for English constituencies
UK MPs 1895–1900
UK MPs 1900–1906
British military personnel of the Second Boer War
Companions of the Order of the Bath
Royal Warwickshire Fusiliers officers
People educated at Eton College
British racehorse owners and breeders
Owners of Epsom Derby winners
1861 births
1902 deaths
People from Richmond, London
British people of Scottish descent
British people of Irish descent